Jovito O. Claudio (June 15, 1927 – December 16, 2009) was the Mayor of Pasay from 1968 to 1971, and again from 1998 to 2000.

Early life and career 
Claudio was born in C. Jose Street in Malibay, Pasay on June 15, 1927.

Claudio finished Medicine in University of Santo Tomas in 1954, and finished medical bar examination at the same year.

His political career started in 1959 when he was elected as top councilor. Four years later, he ran a Vice Mayor and won in a landslide victory.

Claudio won the Pasay congressional race in 1992, beating mayor Pablo Cuneta's son Arding. Claudio successfully defended his congressional seat in 1995.

Claudio was elected mayor in 1998. A year later, Claudio suffered a major stroke. He was then involved in a recall election, where he lost to former vice mayor Wenceslao Trinidad. Claudio conceded to Trinidad after his proclamation.

Personal life 
Claudio married Norma Santos and had one son named Joven (acting councilor in 2006-2007, ran as councilor in 2010).

Death 
Claudio died due to complications from diabetes.

References

1927 births
2009 deaths
Metro Manila city and municipal councilors
University of Santo Tomas alumni
Nacionalista Party politicians
Lakas–CMD (1991) politicians
Mayors of Pasay
Filipino medical doctors
Members of the House of Representatives of the Philippines from Pasay